The 2019 African Badminton Championships was the continental badminton championships to crown the best players and teams across Africa. The tournament was held at the Alfred Diete-Spiff Centre in Port Harcourt, Nigeria, from 22–28 April.

Medalists

In November 2019, Badminton World Federation released a statement regarding doping test failure of Kate Foo Kune in this championships and decided to disqualify her result.

Medal table

Tournament 
The 2019 African Badminton Championships were held in two separate events. The team event, officially All Africa Mixed Team Championships 2019, was a continental tournament to crown the best team in Africa holding from 22–25 April. The individual event, officially All Africa Individual Championships 2019, was a continental tournament to crown the best players in Africa holding from 26–28 April. A total of 18 countries across Africa registered their players to compete at this event. This year's edition served as the first qualifier for African player to compete at the 2020 Summer Olympics.

The tournament was sponsored by the Rivers State Government and organized by the Badminton Federation of Nigeria; the federation prepared a mascot, Alabo The Shuttler, as a reflection of the culture of the people.

Venue 
This tournament was held at the Alfred Diete-Spiff Centre (Civic Centre), Moscow road, Port Harcourt with six courts.

Point distribution
The individual event of this tournament was graded based on the BWF points system for the BWF International Challenge event. Below is the table with the point distribution for each phase of the tournament.

Team event

Group A

Group B

Group C

Group D

Knockout stage

Individual event

Men's singles

Seeds

 Georges Paul (semifinals)
 Anuoluwapo Juwon Opeyori (champions)
 Godwin Olofua (final)
 Adham Hatem Elgamal (second round)
 Ahmed Salah (quarterfinals)
 Daniel Sam (third round)
 Melvin Appiah (third round)
 Habeeb Temitope Bello (third round)

Finals

Top half

Section 1

Section 2

Bottom half

Section 3

Section 4

Women's singles

Seeds

 Kate Foo Kune (final)
 Hadia Hosny (second round)
 Dorcas Ajoke Adesokan (champions)
 Doha Hany (semifinals)
 Aisha Nakiyemba (third round)
 Aïcha Laurene N'Dia (second round)
 Chineye Ibere (quarterfinals)
 Kobita Dookhee (second round)

Finals

Top half

Section 1

Section 2

Bottom half

Section 3

Section 4

Men's doubles

Seeds

 Godwin Olofua / Anuoluwapo Juwon Opeyori (semifinals)
 Mohamed Abderrahime Belarbi / Adel Hamek (second round)
 Koceila Mammeri / Youcef Sabri Medel (champions)
 Abdelrahman Abdelhakim / Ahmed Salah (semifinals)

Finals

Top half

Section 1

Section 2

Bottom half

Section 3

Section 4

Women's doubles

Seeds

 Doha Hany / Hadia Hosny (quarterfinals)
 Halla Bouksani / Linda Mazri (second round)
 Aurélie Allet / Kobita Dookhee (quarterfinals)
 Jemimah Leung For Sang / Ganesha Mungrah (second round)

Finals

Top half

Section 1

Section 2

Bottom half

Section 3

Section 4

Mixed doubles

Seeds

 Ahmed Salah / Hadia Hosny (semifinals)
 Adham Hatem Elgamal / Doha Hany (semifinals)
 Enejoh Abah / Peace Orji (final)
 Tejraj Pultoo / Kobita Dookhee (quarterfinals)
 Alex Zolobe / Lou Gohi Theophile Annick Doulou (second round)
 Kayode Abubakar Mope / Amin Yop Christopher (third round)
 Ebenezer Andrews / Grace Atipaka (third round)
 Ousmane Ouedraogo / Esme Osseane Davila Loess (second round)

Finals

Top half

Section 1

Section 2

Bottom half

Section 3

Section 4

References

External links 
 Individual result
 Team result

African Badminton Championships
African Badminton Championships
African Badminton Championships
African Badminton Championships
Badminton tournaments in Nigeria
African Badminton Championships